Jan Mattheus (born 3 April 1965) is a Belgian former cyclist. He competed in the road race at the 1988 Summer Olympics.

References

External links
 

1965 births
Living people
Belgian male cyclists
Olympic cyclists of Belgium
Cyclists at the 1988 Summer Olympics
People from Torhout
Cyclists from West Flanders